Ben Loyal is an isolated mountain of 764 m in Sutherland, the northwestern tip of the Scottish Highlands. It is a Corbett located south of the Kyle of Tongue and offers good views of the Kyle, Loch Loyal to the east, and Ben Hope to the west.

Ben Loyal is composed chiefly of granite - specifically syenite, and has a distinctive shape due to the four rocky peaks, the highest of which is called An Caisteal. To the north of An Caisteal is the 712 m Sgòr Chaonasaid, to the south is Bheinn Bheag (744 m), which cannot be seen in the photograph opposite, and to the west is the ridge of Sgòr a Chèirich, 644 m at its highest point. The fourth peak in the picture is the 568 m Sgòr Fionnaich.

Ben Loyal's name is thought to mean "law mountain", although the derivation via its modern Gaelic name is not certain.

Access
Ben Loyal is a part of Ben Loyal Estate, formerly owned by Adam Knuth of Knuthenborg, Denmark. In 2012, The Daily Telegraph reported that fellow Dane Anders Holch Povlsen now owned the  estate.

Access is by a farm track which approaches from the north, starting at a farm called Ribigill (rented until the early 20th century by the family of British actor David Mitchell).

See also

Geology of Scotland
Mountain bagging

References

Corbetts
Mountains and hills of the Northwest Highlands
Marilyns of Scotland
Sites of Special Scientific Interest in North West Sutherland